Pobiedno  (Pobidno) is a village in Sanok County, which in turn is a part of Bukowsko rural commune in Nowotaniec parish. Geographically, the village is in the East Małopolska region of Poland and in the Lesser Beskid mountains. Nearby towns include Medzilaborce and Palota of northeastern Slovakia.

History

Historically, the village was first mentioned in 1361. Subsequently, the part of Poland in which Pobiedno resided came under Austrian rule for almost 120 years. In that period, this entire region, including West and East Subcarpathian Voivodship, was known as Galicia.

In 1785 the village had 6.3 km2 of land and 711 Catholics. Notable parts of the village history include the Exaltation of the Holy Cross Church, an Eastern Orthodoxy Church. After Priest Skobielski died in 1800, the village became a filial parish of Wolica and then Dudyńce and in 1918 Pielnia. In 1830, while the village was a filial parish, the church burned down and people changed to the Latin Rite.  On January, 1946 the village was attacked by a strong unit of Ukrainian Insurgent Army (Hereinafter "UPA") and some buildings were burnt. Only over a dozen years after the war did the village start to rebuild.

Geography
The municipality lies at an altitude of 482 metres and covers an area of 6.3 km2. It has a population of about 200 people.

Most popular surnames in the region
1787-1814: Adamski, Ambicki, Bączek, Bąk, Bednarz, Biłas, Brejta, Brusa, Cieśla, Cypcarz,  Drożyłoski, Dudusz, Duduś, Fiał,  Gatoski, Grzyszoski, Gzowski, Hulikoski, Jabczycha, Jastrzębski, Kamiński, Kędzior, Kaskolaba, Kochański, Krulicki, Kopacz, Kuc, Maciejoski, Brechunik, Warchola, Wasylenko, Kotlarz, Maczurzak, Miedziuch, Pyrkan, Pospolitak, Przysztasz, Senko, Struś, Suszko, Fornal, Jurczyk, Marzec, Masłyk, Mazioski, Moskal, Osianski, Pałys, Pastuszak, Pietruszoski, Piotrowski, Pisaniak, Preyta, Pryspa, Rawicki, Romański, Sitarczyk, Sierota,  Skiba,  Sobański, Sobczański, Starego, Sytarczyk, Szelka, Szmyt, Tynik, Welowin, Wierzganoski, Wojciechoski.

References 

Pobiedno